Greg Kennedy is a Canadian military historian and author who currently teaches Strategic Foreign Policy at King's College London. He is also the 2002 winner of the Theodore and Franklin D. Roosevelt Prize in Naval History.

Education 
Kennedy received his BA in History from University of Saskatchewan and his MA in War Studies from Royal Military College of Canada. He then got his PhD from University of Alberta.

Career 
Kennedy taught both History and War Studies as an adjunct professor at Royal Military College of Canada. He joined King's College London in 2000, and was based at the Joint Services Command and Staff College in Shrivenham.

Kennedy is a member of the British Empire at War Research Group and serves as the Director of the Corbett Centre for Maritime Policy Studies, a think tank based out of the Defence Studies Department at King's College London.

Awards 
In 2002, Kennedy was awarded the Theodore and Franklin D. Roosevelt Prize in Naval History for his book Anglo-American Strategic Relations and the Far East 1933–1939.

In 2011, Kennedy was also the recipient of the Society for Military History's Moncado Award, given to "authors of the four best articles published in The Journal of Military History during the previous calendar year".

Publications 
 Far-flung lines : essays on imperial defence in honour of Donald Mackenzie Schurman (with Keith Neilson and D M Schurman). London; Portland, OR: Frank Cass, 1997. . OCLC 36122963.
 The merchant marine in international affairs, 1850-1950. London; Portland, OR: Frank Cass, 2000. . OCLC 44270303.
 Anglo-American Strategic Relations and the Far East 1933–1939. London ; Portland, OR : Frank Cass, 2002. . OCLC 48570896.
 Incidents and international relations : people, power, and personalities (with Keith Neilson). Westport, Conn.: Praeger, 2002. . OCLC 47868724.
 British naval strategy east of Suez, 1900-2000: influences and actions. London; New York: Frank Cass, 2005. . OCLC 55019568.
 Imperial defence: the old world order 1856-1956. London; New York: Routledge, 2008. . OCLC 191872967.
 British propaganda and wars of empire: influencing friend and foe 1900-2010 (with Christopher Tuck). Farnham Surrey UK; Burlington, VT: Ashgate Publishing Limited, [2014]. . OCLC 857743861.

References 

Living people
Canadian maritime historians
Academics of King's College London
Year of birth missing (living people)